Roy Dyke (born 13 February 1945 in Liverpool), is a rock drummer noted for his playing with The Remo Four, Badger, and Ashton, Gardner and Dyke.

He married Stacia Blake, a former dancer with Hawkwind. Since the 1980s, Dyke has lived in Hamburg, Germany, where he works with Boogie House.

Discography
 With The Remo Four
 Smile! (1966)
 Attention (1973)

 With George Harrison
 Wonderwall Music (1968)

 With Ashton, Gardner and Dyke
 Ashton Gardner and Dyke (1969)
 The Worst of Ashton, Gardner + Dyke (1970)
 What a Bloody Long Day It's Been (1972)
 Last Rebel (1973)
 Let it Roll: Live on Stage 1971 (2001)

 With Badger
 One Live Badger (1973)
 White Lady (1974)

 With Pat Travers
 Pat Travers (1976)
 Four Play (2005)

 Sturmfrei (1979)
 Himmel, Arsch & Zwirn (1982)

 With B.Sharp
 B.Sharp (1982)
 You're Making Me Mad (1983)
 Here Come the Blues Again (1991)

 With other bands
 With Family  Its Only a Movie (1973)
 With Curtiss Maldoon  Maldoon (1973)
 With Medicine Head One and One is One (1973)
 With Chris Barber  Drat that Frattle Rat (1974)
 With Axel Zwingenberger Powerhouse Boogie (1979)

References 

1945 births
Living people
English rock drummers
Musicians from Liverpool
Ashton, Gardner and Dyke members
Badger (band) members